Psychiatric Nursing: The Nurse-Patient Relationship is a 1958 American documentary film directed by Lee R. Bobker. It was nominated for an Academy Award for Best Documentary Feature.

See also 
 The Odds Against
 The Revolving Door

See also
 List of American films of 1958

References

External links

1958 films
1958 documentary films
American documentary films
Documentary films about mental health
Films directed by Lee R. Bobker
1950s English-language films
1950s American films